Cuilidh is the second music album by Scottish musician Julie Fowlis, which in 2008 won her the Album of the Year Award at the Scots Trad Music Awards and Best Folk Singer Award at the BBC Radio 2 Folk Music Awards.

Track listing
"Hùg air a' Bhonaid Mhòir" – 2:58
"Mo Ghruagach Dhonn" – 3:59
"An t-Aparan Goirid 's an t-Aparan Ùr: Òran do Sheasaidh Bhaile Raghnaill" – 4:05
"'Ille Dhuinn, 's toigh Leam Thu" – 3:40
"Puirt à beul Set ('S Toigh Leam Fhìn Buntàta 's Ìm/Tha Fionnlagh ag Innearadh/Hùg Oiridh Hiridh Hairidh)" – 3:39
"Set of Jigs (The Thatcher/Peter Byrne's/The Tripper's)" – 3:42
"Mo Dhòmhnallan Fhèin" – 3:57
"Turas san Lochmor" – 4:04
"Òran nan Raiders" – 3:44
"Bodaich Odhar Hoghaigearraidh" – 2:49
"Mo Bheannachd dhan Bhàillidh Ùr" – 4:12
"Aoidh, Na Dèan Cadal Idir" – 2:16

Deluxe edition
A deluxe edition of Cuilidh was released in the UK and Ireland on 1 December 2008. The box set contains Cuilidh, a disc of songs from the album performed live and a DVD documentary on Fowlis.  The box set was released in the United States on 21 April 2009.

Track list

Disc one – Cuilidh
"Hùg air a' Bhonaid Mhòir" – 2:58
"Mo Ghruagach Dhonn" – 3:59
"An t-Aparan Goirid 's an t-Aparan Ùr: Òran do Sheasaidh Bhaile Raghnaill" – 4:05
"'Ille Dhuinn, 's toigh Leam Thu" – 3:40
"Puirt à beul Set ('S Toigh Leam Fhìn Buntàta 's Ìm/Tha Fionnlagh ag Innearadh/Hùg Oiridh Hiridh Hairidh)" – 3:39
"Set of Jigs (The Thatcher/Peter Byrne's/The Tripper's)" – 3:42
"Mo Dhòmhnallan Fhèin" – 3:57
"Turas san Lochmor" – 4:04
"Òran nan Raiders" – 3:44
"Bodaich Odhar Hoghaigearraidh" – 2:49
"Mo Bheannachd dhan Bhàillidh Ùr" – 4:12
"Aoidh, Na Dèan Cadal Idir" – 2:16

Disc two – At Celtic Connections
Lon-Dubh (Blackbird) – 2:24
Òganaich Ùir A Rinn M' Fhàgail [live from Celtic Connections 2008] – 2:49
Mo Bheannachd Dhan Bhàillidh Ùr [live from Celtic Connections 2008] – 4:03
Turas San Lochmor [live from Celtic Connections 2008] – 3:38
Thatcher/Peter Byrne's/The Soup Dragon/Mo Chuachag 's Laghach Thu [live from Celtic Connections 2008] – 4:23
Biodh An Deoch Seo 'n Làimh Mo Rùin [live from Celtic Connections 2008] – 3:21

Disc three – Julie Fowlis Documentary
Hello, I'm Julie Fowlis – 7:23

External links
 Julie Fowlis – official site with lyrics and sleeve notes

Julie Fowlis albums
2007 albums